Tele Finland was a Finnish "no frills" mobile virtual network operator. It was established by TeliaSonera on May 17, 2004 to respond to the demand for inexpensive GSM calls. At first it was a daughter company of TeliaSonera Finland but was fused to it on December 31, 2005. Tele Finland still has its own customer support, own pricing and own terms apart from TeliaSonera customers.

Tele Finland's principles are the equal treatment of customers, good coverage, and the absence of special talktime offers. The operator was able to increase its customer base the fastest of all operators and have the lowest emigration of customers.

Tele Finland quit all advertising and sales on April 1, 2006 but returned in the spring of 2007. 

In 2017, Sonera changed its name to Telia (Finland), and the Tele Finland brand was discontinued.

References

External links
Website

Mobile phone companies of Finland